The 2005–06 Los Angeles Lakers season was the 58th of the franchise in the National Basketball Association (NBA) and the 60th overall. The Lakers finished in third place of the Pacific Division and as the seventh seed of the Western Conference. The season ended with the team being eliminated in seven games against the Phoenix Suns in the First Round of the playoffs after holding a 3-1 series lead. After a year absence, the Lakers rehired Phil Jackson as their head coach. It was the final season that Kobe Bryant wore jersey number 8 before changing it to 24 the following season. Also memorable from this season was during a January 22, 2006 game vs. the Toronto Raptors where Bryant dropped a record 81 points, only the 2nd highest total in NBA history behind Wilt Chamberlain's 100-point game in 1962.

After the playoffs, Bryant underwent arthroscopic surgery on his right knee in July. This led to him missing the 2006 FIBA World Championship.

Draft picks

The Lakers had 3 picks going into the 2005 NBA draft. The Lakers picked seven footer Andrew Bynum as the 10th pick of the draft. Los Angeles also picked Ronny Turiaf and Von Wafer as the 37th and 39th picks respectively.

Roster

Injuries 
 Wednesday November 16, 2005: Slava Medvedenko was sidelined for the rest of the season after he suffered a herniated disc.
 Friday November 18, 2005: Kwame Brown strained his right hamstring and was sidelined for two weeks.
 Tuesday December 20, 2005: Laron Profit ruptured his Achilles'  tendon during a game against the Dallas Mavericks. He underwent surgery on December 23, 2005. He was unable to play for the rest of the season after the surgery.

Player salaries

Regular season 
The Lakers opened the season with an overtime victory against the Denver Nuggets. Despite dipping below .500 during the November, the team recovered and finished 2005 with a 15-14 record. The team went into the All Star Break with a 26-26 record The Lakers did not maintain any long winning streaks nor were they in long losing slumps; their longest winning streak of the season equalled their longest losing streak of 5 games. The team finished the season with a 5-game winning streak, the longest of the season, and an overall 45-37 record. The Lakers finished third in the Pacific Division and qualified for the playoffs as the 7th seed in the Western Conference. In a January home game against the Toronto Raptors, Kobe Bryant scored 81 points, the second most in a single game in NBA history, behind Wilt Chamberlain's 100.

Season standings

Record vs. opponents

Game log

Playoffs 

|- align="center" bgcolor="#ffcccc"
| 1
| April 23
| @ Phoenix
| L 102–107
| Kobe Bryant (22)
| Lamar Odom (14)
| Kobe Bryant (5)
| US Airways Center18,422
| 0–1
|- align="center" bgcolor="#ccffcc"
| 2
| April 26
| @ Phoenix
| W 99–93
| Kobe Bryant (29)
| Kobe Bryant (10)
| Bryant, Odom (5)
| US Airways Center18,422
| 1–1
|- align="center" bgcolor="#ccffcc"
| 3
| April 28
| Phoenix
| W 99–92
| Smush Parker (18)
| Lamar Odom (17)
| Kobe Bryant (7)
| Staples Center18,997
| 2–1
|- align="center" bgcolor="#ccffcc"
| 4
| April 30
| Phoenix
| W 99–98 (OT)
| Lamar Odom (25)
| Kwame Brown (10)
| Kobe Bryant (8)
| Staples Center18,997
| 3–1
|- align="center" bgcolor="#ffcccc"
| 5
| May 2
| @ Phoenix
| L 97–114
| Kobe Bryant (29)
| Lamar Odom (15)
| Lamar Odom (6)
| US Airways Center18,422
| 3–2
|- align="center" bgcolor="#ffcccc"
| 6
| May 4
| Phoenix
| L 118–126 (OT)
| Kobe Bryant (50)
| Lamar Odom (11)
| Lamar Odom (9)
| Staples Center18,997
| 3–3
|- align="center" bgcolor="#ffcccc"
| 7
| May 6
| @ Phoenix
| L 90–121
| Kobe Bryant (24)
| Sasha Vujačić (6)
| Smush Parker (4)
| US Airways Center18,422
| 3–4
|-

Player statistics

Regular season 

*Total for entire season including previous team(s)

Playoffs

Awards and records
Kobe Bryant, All-NBA First Team
Kobe Bryant, NBA All-Defensive First Team

Transactions
On June 14, 2005, the Lakers re-hired head coach Phil Jackson.
On August 2, 2005, the Lakers traded guard/forward Caron Butler and guard Chucky Atkins to the Washington Wizards in exchange for forward Kwame Brown and guard Laron Profit.
The Lakers traded guard Kareem Rush to the Charlotte Bobcats for two future second round draft picks (Ronny Turiaf and TBA). The Bobcats have acquired a second round pick (Ronny Turiaf) in the 2005 NBA draft from Atlanta in exchange for forward/center Predrag Drobnjak. Atlanta Hawks acquired centers Michael Doleac (from the New York Knicks) and Joel Przybilla (from the Milwaukee Bucks), along with a 2005 second-round pick from the Knicks (Ronny Turiaf), while sending center Nazr Mohammed to the Knicks in the three-way trade. The 2005 selection will be the better of the two-second-rounders the Knicks currently own.
On October 26, 2005, The Lakers traded Jumaine Jones to the Charlotte Bobcats in exchange for a 2007 2nd round pick (Sun Yue).
Laron Profit was waived on January 16, 2006.
On March 6, 2006 Jim Jackson was signed as a free agent.

References

Los Angeles Lakers seasons
Los Angle
Los Angle
Los Angle